Nigel Hastilow (born 1956) is a journalist, author, businessman and politician. He is a former editor of the Birmingham Post and was Conservative Party candidate for Birmingham Edgbaston in the 2001 general election. In April 2007, Hastilow was selected a prospective parliamentary candidate (PPC) for the Conservative Party for the Halesowen and Rowley Regis constituency but was deselected after he received criticism about a newspaper column he wrote for the Express & Star which included the statement "Enoch Powell was right", sparking a national controversy about immigration and racism.

Education

Hastilow was born in Birmingham and educated at Mill Hill School in London. After graduating from the University of Birmingham, he trained as a journalist.

Journalism

Working for a variety of local newspapers in Birmingham, Hastilow became first political correspondent and then editor of the Birmingham Post. He subsequently became a columnist, set up his own publishing company which he later sold and also worked for the Institute of Directors and the Institute of Chartered Accountants. He writes regularly for the Express & Star and is author of The Last of England and Tomorrow's England.

Political career
In 2001 Hastilow stood as a Conservative Party candidate in the constituency of Birmingham Edgbaston but lost to the Labour Party candidate at general election.

Earlier that year it had emerged that he had put a comment on his website which was subsequently taken up to attack Hague's leadership by Tony Blair at Prime Ministers Questions. However, the article itself had been approved by then party chairman Michael Ancram and argued that, contrary to the Prime Minister's claims, the Conservatives were the only party capable of defending Britain's interests and warning of Tony Blair's ambition to become the first President of the European Union.

In 2002 Hastilow was elected to Stratford-on-Avon District Council where he served as a councillor for two years. During that period he claimed no expenses. He was the only Conservative to oppose a 52 per cent council tax increase and also succeeded in committing the local authority to opposing the Labour Party's hunting ban.

In April 2007. Hastilow was selected to represent the Conservative Party in the constituency of Halesowen and Rowley Regis. However, he was dumped following the publication of his column in the 5 November edition of the Express & Star which caused political controversy. He stated how allegedly "uncontrolled" immigration was becoming an increasingly big issue for people in his Halesowen and Rowley Regis constituency. He said his constituents claimed that Enoch Powell, a politician noted for his Rivers of Blood speech, was right to warn that uncontrolled immigration would change the country dramatically.

This led to him being heavily criticised by fellow Tories such as David Davis. "Labour MP Peter Hain, then Work and Pensions Secretary, said that Hastilow's remarks showed the Tories' "racist underbelly".

Political beliefs

Hastilow is an active member of the TaxPayers' Alliance, which campaigns for lower taxes and greater value for money in public spending. He is a supporter of The Freedom Association, and has spoken at some of its events including a debate on the future of the BBC, and he is a backer of the Drivers’ Alliance, an organisation dedicated to defending the interests of motorists.
	
He is a strong advocate of free market economics, believing high taxes and increased regulation stifle entrepreneurialism and force businesses to abandon Britain. He believes in the importance of manufacturing industry and regrets that successive governments have neglected this vital aspect of the economy.

A traditionalist on education, he was for some time a member of the Conservative Party committee (chaired by John Bercow, a previous Speaker of the House of Commons) campaigning to protect the country's remaining grammar schools.

Hastilow is a confirmed Euro-sceptic. It was reported in 2008 that he had been approached to stand as a candidate for the UK Independence Party (UKIP) at the European elections.

References

1956 births
Living people
Conservative Party (UK) parliamentary candidates
People educated at Mill Hill School
People from Birmingham, West Midlands
Alumni of the University of Birmingham
UK Independence Party politicians